Albertelli is a surname. Notable people with the surname include:

Luigi Albertelli (1934–2021), Italian songwriter and television author
Mario Albertelli (1904–1966), Italian cinematographer

Italian-language surnames
Patronymic surnames
Surnames from given names